This is a list of episodes for the television series The Sentinel.

Series overview

Episodes

Season 1 (1996)

Season 2 (1996–97)

Season 3 (1997–98)

Season 4 (1999)

External links
 
 

Sentinel
Sentinel
Sentinel